Mixed Nutz is an animated cartoon series produced by Big Bad Boo Studios (formerly Norooz Productions). The show is about a group of friends from different backgrounds in a fictional town called Dyvercity. The main characters are Babak from Iran, Sanjay from India, Adele from Austria, Damaris from Cuba and Jae from Korea. The show has been referred to as "International" Peanuts for the simplicity of the animation style and its multicultural angle.

Big Bad Boo Studios produced 13 half-hour episodes in 2008 with an international cast and crew including Maz Jobrani and producers Aly Jetha and Shabnam Rezaei. The two also produced Babak and Friends- A First Norooz. Mixed Nutz aired on certain PBS and MHz Worldview stations in the United States as well as Shaw TV in Canada.

Mixed Nutz participated in several international film festivals, including the 2008 New York Television Festival and Chashama Film Festival.

References

External links 
 mixednutzshow.com
 Official Big Bad Boo Property Page for Mixed Nutz
 

2000s American animated television series
2008 American television series debuts
2000s Canadian animated television series
2008 Canadian television series debuts
American children's animated education television series
Canadian children's animated education television series
PBS Kids shows
First-run syndicated television programs in the United States
Animated television series about children